Carl Wayne Gilliard (born July 31, 1963) is an American politician from Georgia. Gilliard is a Democrat member of Georgia House of Representatives for District 162.

References

External links 
 Carl Gilliard at ballotpedia.org

Democratic Party members of the Georgia House of Representatives
21st-century American politicians
Living people
1963 births